Séamus Anthony Henchy (6 December 1917 – 5 April 2009) was an Irish judge, barrister and academic who served as judge of the Supreme Court of Ireland between 1972 and 1988. Many of Henchy's judgments are considered to be influential in the development of Irish constitutional law.

Born in County Clare, he studied law and Celtic studies in Galway and Dublin, obtaining a PhD in Celtic studies in 1943. He practiced as a barrister and was appointed to the High Court in 1962. He presided over the Arms Trial in 1970. He was elevated to the Supreme Court in 1972, where he was noted for his opinions in McGee v. The Attorney General, Cahill v. Sutton, Norris v. Attorney General and Crotty v. An Taoiseach. He died in 2009.

Early life 
Henchy was born in 1917 to shopkeepers Patrick and Margaret in Corofin, County Clare as one of seven children. He attended primary school in Corofin and for secondary school wen to St Mary's College, Galway.

His university education began at University College Galway, where he obtained a BA in Celtic studies. He then concurrently studied for a MA in Galway, an LL.B. at University College Dublin and to become a barrister at the King's Inns. He completed a PhD at UCD in 1943, supervised by D. A. Binchy, on the law of fosterage. Using his Irish name, Séamus Ó hInnse and as part of the Dublin Institute for Advanced Studies, he published Miscellaneous Irish annals in 1947.

Legal career 
He was called to the bar in 1943 and primarily practiced in the West of Ireland. He became a senior counsel in 1959. His practice involved civil cases and prosecutions on behalf of the State.

Alongside his legal practice, he was appointed a part-time professor of law at University College Dublin in Roman law, jurisprudence and legal history. He published on "The Communist Theory of Law" in Studies in 1957 and was the first Irish academic published in the Modern Law Review. He also wrote about the role of Visitor and the National University of Ireland.

High Court judge 
His judicial career began in 1962 upon his appointment to the High Court. He presided over many personal injuries cases and heard at first instance as part of a panel of three judges the case of State (Nicolaou) v. An Bord Uchtála. He was the judge in the second trial related to the Arms Crisis in 1970, where Charles Haughey and Neil Blaney stood accused of conspiracy to import arms. The trial required him to have 24-hour Garda protection.

In 1965 he was the chairperson of a commission, joined by Felix Ermacora and Peter Papadatos, convened by the International Commission of Jurists to investigate allegations of racism in the public service of Guyana. They concluded that racial discrimination had occurred. He also chaired the Mental Illness Commission.

Supreme Court judge 
He was elevated to the Supreme Court of Ireland in 1972, following the retirement of Richard McLoughlin. He was frequently president of the Court of Criminal Appeal during the 1970s.

He was best known for his time on the court coinciding with significant constitutional law cases and his opinions in them. He was seen to be a liberal in relation to social issues. His first major decision was in McGee v. The Attorney General which invalidated a law prohibiting the sale of contraceptives in Ireland. In 1983, he issued a dissent in Norris v. Attorney General where the majority upheld a criminal ban on homosexuality. He said that the relevant parts of the legislation were unconstitutional "on the ground that by their overreach and lack of precision and of due discrimination, they trench on an area of personal intimacy and seclusion which requires to be treated as inviolate". He wrote a concurring opinion with the Chief Justice Tom O'Higgins in 1980 in Cahill v. Sutton which established the rule of standing in Irish constitutional law.

He also contributed to decisions establishing the right to legal aid in criminal trials and in the case of Crotty v. An Taoiseach which established the need for a referendum to incorporate new European Union treaties into Irish law.

He retired from the court in October 1988.

Further roles 
Henchy was among those appointed in 1974 to the Anglo-Irish Commission on Law Enforcement, arising out of the Sunningdale Agreement. He chaired a committee which produced a report in 1978 which became the basis for the Criminal Law (Insanity) Act 2006, changing the law on the defence of insanity and introducing the defence of diminished responsibility to Ireland. He was appointed the first chairperson of the Independent Radio and Television Commission for a five-year term beginning in 1988, a body responsible for issuing the first commercial radio licences in Ireland. He retired a year early in order to take up the position.

Legacy 
Henchy was awarded an honorary doctorate by Trinity College Dublin in 1990 and another by NUI Galway in June 1999. At his ceremony at NUIG he was cited as being "one of the most outstanding judges and jurists of 20th-century Ireland". Upon his death, the Irish Independent commented that he was "one of the country's most respected and influential judges." The Times observed that his judgments were "in a flowing prose style of exceptional elegance." Gerard Hogan believed that he was one of Ireland's "greatest judges".

In July 2020, Chief Justice Frank Clarke writing for the Supreme Court in Friends of the Irish Environment v. The Government of Ireland said that he "fully agreed with the observations" of Henchy in approaching unenumerated rights in McGee and Norris.

Personal life 
Henchy was married to Averil Graney. He lived in Monkstown, County Dublin and was a member of the Royal Irish Yacht Club.

He died at the age of 91 in April 2009. His funeral was attended by the Chief Justice of Ireland John L. Murray, the Attorney General of Ireland Paul Gallagher and aides-de-camp to the President of Ireland and the Taoiseach. He is buried at Shanganagh Cemetery.

References

Works cited

1917 births
2009 deaths
People from County Clare
Irish barristers
Alumni of the University of Galway
Alumni of University College Dublin
Alumni of King's Inns
High Court judges (Ireland)
Judges of the Supreme Court of Ireland
20th-century Irish judges
20th-century Irish lawyers
Celtic studies scholars
Irish legal scholars
Academics of University College Dublin